The 2017 African Handball Champions League was the 39th edition, organized by the African Handball Confederation, under the auspices of the International Handball Federation, the handball sport governing body. The tournament was held from October 20–29, 2017 at the salles Hammamet and Nabeul in Hammamet, Tunisia, contested by 14 teams and won by Zamalek of Egypt.

Zamalek qualified to the 2018 IHF Super Globe.

Draw

Preliminary rounds

Times given below are in CET UTC+1.

Group A

 Note:  Advance to quarter-finals Relegated to 9th place classification Relegated to 13th place classification

Group B

 Note:  Advance to quarter-finals Relegated to 9th place classification Relegated to 13th place classification

Group C

 Note:  Advance to quarter-finals Relegated to 9th place classification

Knockout stage

Championship bracket

5-8th bracket

9th place

9-12th classification

Quarter-finals

13th place

9th place classification

5-8th classification

Semi-finals

7th place

5th place

3rd place

Final

Final standings

Awards

See also 
 2017 African Handball Cup Winners' Cup

External links
 
 Tournament profile at Goalzz.com

References 

African Handball Champions League
2017 in African handball
2017 in Tunisian sport